Tromsø Sparebank was a savings bank based in Tromsø, Norway. It was established in 1836 and merged with Sparebanken Nord in 1989 to form Sparebanken Nord-Norge. The bank established a branch in Longyearbyen in 1959.

References

Defunct banks of Norway
Banks established in 1836
Banks disestablished in 1989
1989 disestablishments in Norway
Companies based in Tromsø
Norwegian companies established in 1836